Six of the ten North Carolina incumbents were re-elected.

References

See also 
 List of United States representatives from North Carolina
 United States House of Representatives elections, 1794 and 1795

1795
North Carolina
United States House of Representatives